Karimou is a surname. Notable people with the surname include:

Hassan Karimou (born 1959), Nigerien long-distance runner
Rafiatou Karimou (1946–2018), Beninese politician

Surnames of African origin